Eurythyrea quercus is a species of metallic wood-boring beetle in the family Buprestidae.

References

Further reading

 
 
 
 
 
 
 

Buprestidae
Beetles described in 1780